The 1973–74 Georgetown Hoyas men's basketball team represented Georgetown University during the 1973–74 NCAA Division I college basketball season. John Thompson, coached them in his second season as head coach. The team was an independent and played its home games at McDonough Gymnasium on the Georgetown campus in Washington, D.C. A young and inexperienced team, it played inconsistently, finished the season with a record of 13-13, and had no post-season play.

Season recap

Sophomore center Merlin Wilson had posted scoring and rebounding statistics unprecedented in Georgetown basketball history during his freshman year, drawing national attention. Opponents paid extra attention to defending against him this season, and foul trouble limited his performance in the early games. Thompson moved him to power forward in January 1974, and this allowed him to return to form, with 23 points and 16 rebounds against Chicago State and 23 rebounds each in games a week apart against Holy Cross and Penn State. He averaged 15.5 rebounds per game for the season, a school record still well beyond the average posted by any other Hoya.

Sophomore guard Jonathan Smith led the team in scoring this season, finishing with 466 points, the third-highest total in a single season for a Georgetown player. He scored 20 or more points numerous times, averaged 25 points per game in the latter part of the season, and scored a season-high 32 points against Connecticut on February 16, 1974.

Sophomore forward Bill Lynn had seen little action as a reserve the previous season, but a back injury to forward Mark Gallagher that ended Gallaghers Georgetown career gave Lynn more playing time this year. He finished the season second on the team in both scoring and rebounding with an average of 13 points and 8.1 rebounds per game, including 20 points and nine rebounds against 2nd-ranked Notre Dame and 28 points and 18 rebounds against Boston College.

Freshman forward Larry Long scored a career-high 25 points against Boston College and finished the year averaging 7.1 points per game. He started every game, but an injury he suffered at St. Joseph's was the beginning of many injuries that would hamper him for the rest of his collegiate career.

The 1973-74 squad was not ranked in the Top 20 in the Associated Press Poll or Coaches' Poll at any time. It was the last Georgetown men's basketball team to finish a season without a winning record until the 1998–99 season. It also was the last one to have no post-season play in the NCAA Division I men's basketball tournament or the National Invitation Tournament (NIT) until the 2001-02 team declined an invitation to the 2002 NIT, and the last one to receive no invitation to either the NCAA tournament or the NIT until the 2003-04 season.

Roster
Source

1973–74 schedule and results

Sources

|-
!colspan=9 style="background:#002147; color:#8D817B;"| Regular Season

References

Georgetown Hoyas men's basketball seasons
Georgetown
Georgetown Hoyas men's basketball team
Georgetown Hoyas men's basketball team